The Bishop of Bolton is an episcopal title used by a suffragan bishop of the Church of England Diocese of Manchester, in the province of York, England. The title takes its name after the town of Bolton in Greater Manchester; the See was erected under the Suffragans Nomination Act 1888, by Order in Council dated 8 February 1984.

On 22 June 2016, it was announced that Mark Ashcroft, Archdeacon of Manchester, has been appointed the next Bishop of Bolton following his consecration, which duly occurred on 18 October 2016.

List of bishops

References

External links
 Crockford's Clerical Directory - Listings

 
Bolton
Bishop of Bolton